Heartland Football Club founded as Spartans F.C., later known as Iwuanyanwu Nationale from 1985 to 2006 is a Nigerian football club based in Owerri. The team play their home games at Dan Anyiam Stadium (but currently use the new Okigwe Stadium as their temporary home ground pending renovations at the Dan Anyiam Stadium). Their local rivals are Enyimba FC and Enugu Rangers. They reached the finals of the 1988 African Cup of Champions Clubs and 2009 CAF Champions League, the premier African continental club tournament, and won four straight Nigerian league titles from 1987 to 1990.

Until their 18th place showing and relegation in 2016, they were one of two teams in the top flight that had never been relegated. In October 2017, Heartland won the Nigeria National League Southern Conference to gain promotion back up to the top flight.

History
The club were founded as Spartans FC in 1976. Their first international match was a friendly played against Ararat Yerevan of the USSR which Spartans won 2–0 at the Township Stadium, Tetlow Road, Owerri, in August 1976. Spartans FC were supported by the Imo State government, which itself had been founded in 1976, and had the support of the state administration, including the state military. Spartans FC played matches at the Old Owerri Stadium.

Iwuanyanwu Nationale FC (1985–2006)
Spartans FC were renamed Iwuanyanwu Nationale FC in 1985 following a successful change of ownership from Imo State Government to chief Emmanuel Iwuanyanwu. Iwuanyanwu Nationale embarked on a 3-week training tour of Brazil in January 1986. That season, Nationale finished runner-up of the Nigerian top league.

The late 1980s were the most successful time in the club's history, when they won four straight championships from 1987 to 1990. During this time, the club featured several Nigerian national team players, such as Thompson Oliha, Benedict Iroha, and Uche Okechukwu.

Iwuanyanwu Nationale finally emerged as League winners in 1987 ahead of Leventis United on goal difference, the first of four straight championships. The league win earned them the right to represent Nigeria in CAF Champions Cup. In 1988, Iwuanyanwu Nationale repeated as League champions and completed the double as they won the Nigerian FA Cup for the first time, beating Flash Flamingoes of Benin 3–0 in the final. The club also reached CAF Champions Cup final, winning 1–0 in first leg tie in Ibadan, losing 4–0 in Constantine, Algeria in return leg versus Entente Setif.

In 1989, the Iwuanyanwu retained the league title but lost the FA Cup final 0–1 to BCC Lions. They played Stationery Stores of Lagos in Lagos in the first ever game of the newly professional Nigerian league and won 2–1, with Ben Iroha scoring the first goal. Nationale emerged as the first pro league winners in Nigeria.

The club's fortunes finally changed for the worse in 1991, when Nationale lost the league title to Julius Berger. The club also crashed out of CAF Champions Cup in the semifinals, losing to Nakivubo of Uganda 4–3 on aggregate, including a 1–1 draw at home where a win would have qualified them for the final.

Nationale won the league title again in 1993 following a 2–0 away victory over El-Kanemi Warriors in last league fixture to edge out Bendel Insurance to the title race. The 1993 team featured a young Nwankwo Kanu, who at the age of 16 scored 15 goals in 25 matches. Kanu would move on to Ajax after the 1993 season.

Tragedy struck Heartland in the champions league in 1994. Nationale reached the Champions Cup quarter-final, losing 3–0 to Espérance de Tunis of Tunisia in first leg tie, 18 September, in Algeria. Iwuanyanwu chartered an Oriental Airlines plane to fly home from Tunis the night of the game, but upon landing at Tamanrasset in southern Algeria, the plane hit a runway lamp and a fire truck and crashed. Two players, defender Aimola Omale and goalkeeper Uche Ikeogu, lost their lives in the accident, along with the pilots and a flight attendant. According to striker Tony Nwaigwe, the plane broke into three pieces on landing.

Due to the crash, the CAF shifted the return leg match in Owerri from 3 to 10 October. Nationale would draw the return match 1–1, failing to advance in the competition.

The 1995 season, the first after the plane crash, Iwuanyanwu faced more adversity in the Nigerian domestic league. Led by manager Uche Ejimofor, Iwuanyanwu managed to survive a relegation battle by only a couple games, which included a match which was replayed two times against 1994 champions BCC Lions, finally ending in a 1–1 draw.

1999 saw Iwuanyanwu win the league but they ended up losing the title to Lobi Stars of Makurdi in the inaugural Super League play-off. They also finished runners up in the Nigerian F.A. Cup to Plateau United after breaking the hearts of city neighbors FC Arugo in the semifinals with a 2–1 victory. Arugo had just been set up that in 1999 by former Iwuanyanwu manager Uche Ejimofor.

In 2000, Iwuanyanwu player Gabriel Anats died during the season from a tetanus infection.

In 2005, Iwuanyanwu finished third in Premier League and also in the Coca-Cola FA Cup with coach Stanley Eguma in charge.

Heartland FC
On 7 February 2006, the Imo State Government re-acquired ownership of the club from chief Emmanuel Iwuanyanwu and renamed it Heartland FC.

Heartland finished second in the 2008 Premier League by one point to Kano Pillars, earning a Champions League slot in 2009. Heartland would go on to make the finals of the  2009 CAF Champions League, losing to away goals to TP Mazembe after tying 2–2 on aggregate. Heartland won the first leg at home 2–1 but an own goal in the 73rd minute in the return leg in Lubumbashi meant the Nigerian side finished as runners-up.

After the club's failure to win the Champions League, they brought in Christian Chukwu as a technical consultant and Fan Ndubuoke as general manager. In 2011, the club won the Federation Cup, its first silverware since its last league win in 1993. Heartland defeated highly fancied Enyimba 1–0 thanks to a 40th-minute goal by their captain, Chinedu Efugh. Randsom Madu, a player on the 1993 cup winning team, was on the technical staff, and could celebrate winning as both a player and a coach. Heartland could not replicate their success in the league, finishing mid-table.

Heartland defended its cup win in 2012 by defeating Lobi Stars 2–1 in the finals held at the Teslim Balogun Stadium in Lagos. In 2013, Heartland were eliminated from the Confederations Cup due to a walkover against US Bitam of Gabon. Heartland won the first leg 2–1 in Owerri, but were delayed leaving Nigeria due to visa and travel issues, and did not make it to Gabon in time for the match. Their protest was unsuccessful, and Bitam advanced in the competition.

The club was relegated for the first time in 2016.

Relegation To NNL
Ending 18th in the 2016 Nigeria Professional Football League ensured the club went on relegation for the first time since its 40-year existence. On the final day of the season, Heartland abandoned their game against Plateau United in the 75th minute after a disallowed goal which was to give them a 2–1 lead. Heartland was eventually penalized by the League Management for abandoning their game and 3 points and 3 goals was awarded to Plateau United. Heartland were also levied a fine of N3 million. The result of this meant that MFM FC would remain in the league at Heartland's expense.

They only spent a year at the second level, winning the Southern division with a game to spare, ending on 61 points and 18 wins, 7  draws and 7 losses.

Heartland hired former MFM FC coach Fidelis Ilechukwu as manager in August 2019.

Achievements
Nigerian Premier League: 5
1987, 1988, 1989, 1990, 1993.

Nigerian FA Cup: 3
1988, 2011, 2012.

Nigerian Super Cup: 2
2011, 2012.

Performance in CAF competitions

African Cup of Champions Clubs: 5 appearances
1988 – Finalist
1989 – Second Round
1990 – Semi-finals
1991 – Semi-finals
1994 – Quarter-finals

CAF Champions League: 2 appearances
2009 – Finalist
2010 – Group Stage

CAF Cup: 1 appearance
2000 – Semi-finals

CAF Confederation Cup: 3 appearances
2006 – Group Stage
2012 – Second Round
2013 – First Round

Results in CAF competitions

Current squad
As of 30 December 2020

Former coaches
 Uche Ejimofor (1985–1997)
 Ossai Chukwuka
 Kelechi Emetole
Mitko Dobrev (Aug 2007 – 9 Jan)
Ben Iroha (2009–??)
Lodewijk de Kruif (March 2010–??)
Samson Siasia (July –Dec 2010)
Christian Chukwu (interim) (Feb 2011 – 11 March)
Lodewijk de Kruif (2011–12)
Promise Nwachukwu
Ramson Madu (2016–2018)
  Mehmet Tayfun Türkmen
Fidelis Ilechukwu (2019–current)

References

External links

 Official website

 
Football clubs in Nigeria
Owerri
Imo State
Association football clubs established in 1976
1976 establishments in Nigeria
Sports clubs in Nigeria